Camp Hancock Site on Main Ave. in Bismarck, North Dakota was built in 1872.  It has also been known as Camp Hancock Historic Site and as Camp Hancock.  It was listed on the National Register of Historic Places in 1972.

It served as a garrison for troops guarding the construction of railway through the area during 1872–1877.

One exhibit is the Bread of Life Church, (later St. George's Episcopal Church) which was completed in 1881 and moved here in 1965.

See also
 List of the oldest buildings in North Dakota

References

External links
 Camp Hancock State Historic Site - official site

Military facilities on the National Register of Historic Places in North Dakota
Infrastructure completed in 1872
Museums in Bismarck, North Dakota
North Dakota State Historic Sites
Military and war museums in North Dakota
History museums in North Dakota
National Register of Historic Places in Bismarck, North Dakota
1872 establishments in Dakota Territory